Pyramid Lake may refer to:

Pyramid Lake (Alberta), Canada
Pyramid Lake (Los Angeles County, California)
Pyramid Lake (El Dorado County, California)
Pyramid Lake (Nevada)

See also
 Pyramid Lake Indian Reservation, Nevada
 Pyramid Lake War